Napsin-A is an aspartic proteinase that is encoded in humans by the NAPSA gene. The name napsin comes from novel aspartic proteinase of the pepsin family.

The activation peptide of an aspartic proteinase acts as an inhibitor of the active site. These peptide segments, or pro-parts, are deemed important for correct folding, targeting, and control of the activation of aspartic proteinase zymogens. The pronapsin A gene is expressed predominantly in lung and kidney. Its translation product is predicted to be a fully functional, glycosylated aspartic proteinase precursor containing an RGD motif and an additional 18 residues at its C-terminus.

Utility
Detection of NAPSA gene expression can be used to distinguish adenocarcinomas from other forms of lung cancer.

References

Further reading

Human proteins